Vahdapar va Arbandi Sistani (also Romanized as Vāḥdapar va Arbandī Sīstānī) is a village in Mashiz Rural District, in the Central District of Bardsir County, Kerman Province, Iran. At the 2006 census, its population was 10, in 4 families.

References 

Populated places in Bardsir County